Ariana DeBose is an American actress of the stage and screen who has received recognition and accolades for her varying performances; such as her portrayal of Donna Summer in the 2018 Broadway musical Summer: The Donna Summer Musical, for which she was nominated for the Tony Award for Best Featured Actress in a Musical; and as Anita in Steven Spielberg's 2021 film adaptation of West Side Story, winning the Academy Award (Oscar), BAFTA Award, Critics' Choice Award, Golden Globe Award and Screen Actors Guild Award for Best Supporting Actress. She has also received recognition for her performances in multiple stage plays and musicals; including Hairspray (2011), Bring It On: The Musical (20112012), Pippin (2014), Hamilton (2015) and A Bronx Tale (2016); films such as Hamilton and The Prom (both 2020); and television series such as the documentary Hamilton's America (2016) and the musical comedy series Schmigadoon! (2021present).

Her other achievements include finishing in the top 20 of the sixth season of So You Think You Can Dance in 2009 and earning a nomination for the BAFTA Rising Star Award in 2022 following her breakthrough role of Anita in 2021's West Side Story, a Spielberg rendition of the 1961 film and 1957 stage musical of the same name. Additionally, her 2022 Oscar win for West Side Story made her the first Afro-Latina and openly queer woman of color to receive an Oscar in an acting category.

Major associations

Academy Awards

BAFTA Awards

Golden Globe Awards

Screen Actors Guild Awards

Tony Awards

Theatre awards

Chita Rivera Awards

Drama League Awards

Critics awards

Alliance of Women Film Journalists Awards

Austin Film Critics Association Awards

Chicago Film Critics Association Awards

Critics' Choice Movie Awards

Dallas–Fort Worth Film Critics Association Awards

Detroit Film Critics Society Awards

Florida Film Critics Circle Awards

Georgia Film Critics Association Awards

Hollywood Critics Association Awards

Houston Film Critics Society Awards

London Film Critics' Circle Awards

Los Angeles Film Critics Association Awards

National Society of Film Critics Awards

New York Film Critics Online Awards

Online Film Critics Society Awards

San Diego Film Critics Society Awards

San Francisco Bay Area Film Critics Circle Awards

Santa Barbara International Film Festival Awards

Seattle Film Critics Society Awards

Washington D.C. Area Film Critics Association Awards

Miscellaneous awards

Black Reel Awards

Dorian Awards

International Cinephile Society Awards

NAACP Image Awards

References 

DeBose, Ariana